Emanuel Yáñez Machín (born 23 February 1985) is a Uruguayan professional track and road cyclist.

Major results

2003
 1st Overall 
2006
 1st Stage 9 Vuelta del Uruguay
 1st Stage 9 Vuelta Ciclista de Chile
2009
 1st Stage 2 Rutas de America
2010
 4th Overall Vuelta del Paraguay
2011
 5th Overall Vuelta del Uruguay
1st Stage 3
2012
 1st  Road race, National Road Championships
2014
 1st  Road race, National Road Championships

References

External links
 

1985 births
Living people
Uruguayan male cyclists
Vuelta Ciclista de Chile stage winners